Oggaz District is a district of Mascara Province, Algeria.

Municipalities
The district is further divided into 3 municipalities:
Oggaz
Alaimia
Ras Ain Amirouche

Districts of Mascara Province